Vladimir Vladimirovich Kozlov (born 4 March 1946) is a retired Soviet football player and a current Russian coach. He coaches the youth team of FC Dynamo Moscow.

Honours
 Soviet Top League runner-up: 1967, 1970.
 Soviet Cup winner: 1967, 1970.
 UEFA Cup Winners' Cup finalist: 1972.
 Top 33 players year-end list: 1968, 1969, 1970.

International career
Kozlov made his debut for USSR on 16 June 1968 in a friendly against Austria.

External links
Profile 

1946 births
Footballers from Moscow
Living people
Russian footballers
Association football forwards
Soviet footballers
Soviet Union international footballers
Soviet Top League players
FC Dynamo Moscow players
FC Lokomotiv Moscow players